Justus Ferdinand Poggenburg I (May 20, 1840–December 16, 1893) was a German born American botanist.

Poggenburg was born in Holtum, today part of Wegberg in the district of Heinsberg in North Rhine-Westphalia, Germany. He was married with Mary Catherine Franckhauser (ca. 1841–1905), their son Justus Ferdinand Poggenburg II was a billiards champion, also like their grandson Justus Ferdinand Poggenburg III. 

Together with Nathaniel Lord Britton, Emerson Ellick Sterns and three others, Poggenburg was the author of a catalogue of plants of the New York region that applied the principle of priority more strictly than had been done before, and so caused a rift between American and European botanists.
The standard author abbreviation for Poggenburg when citing a botanical name is Poggenb., and Poggenburg is also included alongside Britton and Sterns in the joint abbreviation "B.S.P.".
He died, aged 53, in New York on December 16, 1893.

References

External links

1840 births
1893 deaths
American botanists
Botanists with author abbreviations